Ferndale School, also known as District 6 School, is a historic one-room school located at Ferndale in Sullivan County, New York.  It was built about 1850 and is a one-story, wood-frame building with clapboard siding surmounted by a gable roof with exposed rafters.  It is three bays wide and five bays deep.  A small wing was added in the early 20th century.  Also on the property is a woodshed.  It was used as a school into the 1950s.

It was added to the National Register of Historic Places in 2005.

References

One-room schoolhouses in New York (state)
Schoolhouses in the United States
School buildings on the National Register of Historic Places in New York (state)
School buildings completed in 1850
Buildings and structures in Sullivan County, New York
National Register of Historic Places in Sullivan County, New York